Alan Kennington (1906–1986) was a British novelist and playwright, particularly known for his thrillers. Two of his novels were adapted into films, the 1939 novel The Night Has Eyes was made into a 1942 film of the same title while She Died Young (1938) was turned into the 1956 film You Can't Escape. His 1949 novel Pastures New was a comedy about American students in post-war Britain.

Selected works
 She Died Young (1938)
 The Night Has Eyes (1939)
 Flying Visitor (1946)
 Pastures New (1949)
 Blood Velvet (1954)

References

Bibliography
 Curthoys, Ann & Lake, Marilyn. Connected Worlds: History in Transnational Perspective. ANU E Press, 2006.
 Goble, Alan. The Complete Index to Literary Sources in Film. Walter de Gruyter, 1999.
 Wearing, J.P. The London Stage 1930-1939: A Calendar of Productions, Performers, and Personnel.  Rowman & Littlefield, 2014.

External links

1906 births
1986 deaths
British writers